Chris Harris on Cars is a British-American motoring television series, presented by Chris Harris, and broadcast by BBC America from July 11, 2016. It is a spinoff show to Top Gear, and is also a television rebooted series of YouTube motoring series Chris Harris on Cars. The series concluded on August 22, 2016 and was replaced by Top Gear America in 2017.

Production
In July 2016, it was announced that Top Gear presenter Chris Harris would be broadcast on BBC America, starting on July 11, 2016. The show features the same title as Harris' YouTube channel. BBC America have also used the same title card from the Chris Harris on Cars YouTube channel.

In September 2016, Harris announced that the show had gone on hiatus, in order for him to concentrate on filming Top Gear. The show has been cancelled due to the announcement of Top Gear America.

Episodes

Broadcast
The show is broadcast internationally on BBC Brit in countries such as: Australia, South America, South Africa, Poland and Scandinavia. It will not be aired in the United Kingdom.

Reception
Chris Harris on Cars is competing against Harris' other new show Chris Harris Drives, which airs on the official Top Gear website. He has since "said goodbye" to his Chris Harris on Cars YouTube channel, as he is "really busy" with his new shows.

References

External links
 Episodes
 Official website

2016 American television series debuts
English-language television shows